Uzbekistan competed at the 2012 Winter Youth Olympics in Innsbruck, Austria. The Uzbek team consisted of one athlete an alpine skier.

Alpine skiing

Uzbekistan qualified 1 athlete.

Men

See also
Uzbekistan at the 2012 Summer Olympics

References

2012 in Uzbekistani sport
Nations at the 2012 Winter Youth Olympics
Uzbekistan at the Youth Olympics